Gregory I (died 755) was the Duke of Naples from 740. He also bore the title hypatus.

Sources

755 deaths
8th-century dukes of Naples
Year of birth unknown